Kamno is a village on the left bank of the Soča River in the Municipality of Tolmin in the Littoral region of Slovenia.

The parish church in the settlement is dedicated to the Holy Trinity and belongs to the Diocese of Koper.

References

External links 
Kamno on Geopedia

Populated places in the Municipality of Tolmin